The Vils is a  river, a left tributary of the Lech in the Alps of Austria and Germany.

It originates in the Allgäu Alps in Tyrol from the supplies of the Vilsalpsee, and is its only discharge. Its water flows first in the northern and northwestern directions, in the Reutte district through the Vils Valley and the Tannheim Valley. In the latter valley it runs alongside the B 199 road through Tannheim, Zoeblen and Schattwald. From here the Vils descends down the waterfall , only slightly east/northeast of the Oberjoch Pass and only a few hundred metres east of the border to Germany. Then the river crosses the border into southern Bavaria, turns northeast and reaches the municipality Pfronten in the district Ostallgäu. Then it flows eastwards along the B 308, again crossing the border into Tyrol, flows below the Tannheim Mountains slightly south of the German border and parallel to this through the municipality Vils. After crossing the B 179 underneath it flows directly into the Lech.

See also
List of rivers of Bavaria
List of rivers of Austria

References

Rivers of Bavaria
Rivers of Tyrol (state)
International rivers of Europe
Rivers of Austria
Rivers of Germany